Kilbrin GAA is a Gaelic Athletic Association club based in the village of Kilbrin in the north-west of County Cork, Ireland which forms part of the parish of Ballyclough and Kilbrin. The club plays both Gaelic Football and Hurling and is affiliated with Duhallow GAA. The club competes in the Duhallow Junior A Hurling Championship and the Duhallow Junior B Football Championship.

At under age level, an amalgamation of Kilbrin and Castlemagner as Croke Rovers has addressed an issue as neither club would have been able to field an underage team on their own. They played as Croke Rovers underage up to Minor level and in 2012 amalgamated up to U21 level.
Kilbrin GAA has regular updates via their Twitter  and their club lotto jackpot can be won here. You can find a collection of Kilbrin GAA matches from over the years on their YouTube page here

Honours
 Duhallow Junior A Hurling Championship (11) 1978, 1989, 1992, 1999, 2004, 2007, 2011, 2012,   2013   2014, 2016 
 Duhallow Junior A Hurling League (9) 1955, 1978, 1979, 1984, 1992, 1996, 2002, 2013, 2015  
 Duhallow Junior B Hurling Championship (6) 1981, 1982, 1984, 1991, 2001, 2013
 Duhallow Junior B Hurling League (4) 2011, 2012, 2013, 2016
 Duhallow U21 Hurling Championship (5) 1978, 1996, 1999, 2009, 2010
Duhallow Junior B Football Championship (4) 2007, 2008, 2009, 2021   
 Duhallow Novice Football Championship (1) 1955
 Duhallow U21 B Football Championship (1) 1995 
 Duhallow U21 C Football Championship (2) 2006, 2007
 Cork Junior B Football Championship (3) 1985, 1996, 2010
 Cork Junior A Hurling Championship Runner-Up 2013

Noted players
 William Egan

See also
 Duhallow GAA
 Croke Rovers

References

Gaelic games clubs in County Cork
Gaelic football clubs in County Cork